Rhein-Mosel is a Verbandsgemeinde ("collective municipality") in the district Mayen-Koblenz, in Rhineland-Palatinate, Germany. It is situated along the lower course of the river Moselle, south-west of Koblenz. The seat of the municipality is in Kobern-Gondorf. It was formed on 1 July 2014 by the merger of the former Verbandsgemeinden Untermosel and Rhens.

The Verbandsgemeinde Rhein-Mosel consists of the following Ortsgemeinden ("local municipalities"):

{|
|- valign=top
|
 Alken
 Brey
 Brodenbach
 Burgen
 Dieblich
 Hatzenport
 Kobern-Gondorf
 Lehmen
 Löf
||
 Macken
 Niederfell
 Nörtershausen
 Oberfell
 Rhens
 Spay
 Waldesch
 Winningen
 Wolken
|}

Verbandsgemeinde in Rhineland-Palatinate